The School of Dentistry is a dental school at the University of Missouri-Kansas City. The School of Dentistry is located on Hospital Hill in Kansas City, close to the University of Missouri–Kansas City School of Medicine, Truman Medical Center-Hospital Hill and Children's Mercy Hospital.

History 
It was established in 1881 as the Kansas City Dental College and was originally part of Kansas City Medical College.

In 1941 the Kansas City Dental College merged with Western Dental College to form the Kansas City-Western Dental College.

In 1965, Dr. Donald Randolph Brown, Sr. DDS became the school's first African American graduate.

Alumni 
 Copeland Shelden

References

Dentistry
Dental schools in Missouri
Educational institutions established in 1881
1881 establishments in Missouri